B.Shigigatti is a village in Dharwad district of Karnataka, India.

Demographics 
As of the 2011 Census of India there were 125 households in B.Shigigatti and a total population of 664 consisting of 335 males and 329 females. There were 81 children ages 0-6.

References

Villages in Dharwad district